François-Charles de Bourlamaque (the surname can also be seen as Burlamaqui) (1716 – 1764) was a French military leader and Governor of Guadeloupe from 1763.

Biography
His father Francesco Burlamacchi was born in Lucca, Tuscany. He began as military engineer, major-captain, infantry colonel, infantry commandant, commandant, general brigadier, major-general, commander of Saint-Louis, honorary order of Malta, and Governor of Guadeloupe.

After entering the French army, Bourlamaque was promoted to the rank of colonel in 1756. He was sent to Canada in 1756 as third-in-command of the regular troops and served with distinction throughout the subsequent campaign in Canada. In the Battle of Carillon in 1758 he commanded the French left and in 1759 led the French forces at Ticonderoga and was made a Brigadier-General. The following year he with a small force attempted to defend the area around Trois-Rivières during the British thrust on Montreal but to no avail. After the French capitulation he became a Major-General in 1762.

References

 W. Stewart WALLACE, ed., The Encyclopedia of Canada, vol. I, Toronto, University Associates of Canada, 1948, p. 272

External links
 Biography at the Dictionary of Canadian Biography Online

French generals
1716 births
1764 deaths
Military personnel from Paris
French colonial governors of Guadeloupe
Commanders of the Order of Saint Louis
French people of the French and Indian War